A form filler is a software program that automatically fills forms in a UI. Form fillers can be part of a larger program, like a web browser, password manager or even an enterprise single sign-on (E-SSO) solution.

A form filler is the opposite of a screen scraper, which extracts data from a form.

See also
 Enterprise single sign-on
 OpenID
 Password manager

References

External links
 IETF RFC 3106

Communication software